Indianola is a U.S. city in Sunflower County, Mississippi, in the Mississippi Delta. The population was 10,683 at the 2010 census. It is the county seat of Sunflower County.

History
In 1891, Minnie M. Cox was appointed postmaster of Indianola, becoming the first black female postmaster in the United States. Her rank was raised from fourth class to third class in 1900, and she was appointed to a full four-year term. Cox's position was one of the most respected and lucrative public posts in Indianola, as it served approximately 3,000 patrons and paid $1,100 annually, then a large sum. White resentment to Cox's prestigious position began to grow, and in 1902 some white residents in Indianola drew up a petition requesting Cox's resignation. James K. Vardaman, editor of The Greenwood Commonwealth and a white supremacist, began delivering speeches reproaching the people of Indianola for "tolerating a negro wench as a postmaster."

Racial tensions grew, and threats of physical harm led Cox to submit her resignation to take effect on January 1, 1903. The incident attracted national attention, and President Theodore Roosevelt refused to accept her resignation, feeling Cox had been wronged, and the authority of the federal government was being compromised. "Roosevelt stood resolute. Unless Cox's detractors could prove a reason for her dismissal other than the color of her skin, she would remain the Indianola postmistress."

Roosevelt closed Indianola's post office on January 2, 1903, and rerouted mail to Greenville; Cox continued to receive her salary. The same month, the United States Senate debated the Indianola postal event for four hours, and Cox left Indianola for her own safety and did not return. In February 1904, the post office was reopened but was demoted in rank from third class to fourth class.

In July 1954, two months after the Supreme Court of the United States announced its unanimous decision in Brown v. Board of Education, ruling that school segregation was unconstitutional, the local plantation manager Robert B. Patterson met with a group of like-minded people in a private home in Indianola to form the White Citizens' Council.

Geography

Demographics

2020 census

As of the 2020 United States Census, there were 9,646 people, 3,483 households, and 2,209 families residing in the city.

2000 census
As of the census of 2000, there were 12,066 people, 3,899 households, and 2,982 families living in the city. The population density was 1,400.3 people per square mile (540.5/km). There were 4,118 housing units at an average density of 477.9 per square mile (184.5/km). The racial makeup of the city was 25.73% White, 73.38% African American, 0.01% Native American, 0.46% Asian American, 0.16% from other races, and 0.27% from two or more races. Hispanic or Latino of any race were 0.71% of the population.

1990 census 
As of the census of 1990, there were 11,809 people. The racial makeup of the city was 65.69% (7,757) Black or African American, 33.39% (3,943) White, 0.14% (17) Native American, 0.19% (23) Asian American, and 0.03% (4) from other races. 0.55% (65) were Hispanic or Latino of any race.

Economy
Because Indianola is located at the intersection of U.S. Route 49W and U.S. Route 82, as of 2004 it is one of the last economically viable small towns in the Mississippi Delta. In the 1980s and 1990s the city government convinced a major retailer to build a distribution center near the intersection of the two highways. This development infused cash into the local economy and allowed semiskilled jobs to be established.

In August 2011, Delta Pride, a catfish processing company, closed its plant in Indianola.

Culture 

J. Todd Moye, author of Let the People Decide: Black Freedom and White Resistance Movements in Sunflower County, Mississippi, 1945–1986, said that "Life in Indianola still moves at a pace established by its distinguishing characteristic, the picturesque and languid Indian Bayou that winds through downtown."

Blues
Indianola is the birthplace of the blues musician Albert King. The blues harp player, Little Arthur Duncan, was born in Indianola in 1934.

B.B. King grew up in Indianola as a child. He came to the blues festival named after him every year. King referenced the city with the title of his 1970 album Indianola Mississippi Seeds. The B.B. King Museum and Delta Interpretive Center, a $14 million facility dedicated to King and the blues, opened in September 2008.

Education
The Sunflower County Consolidated School District, headquartered in Indianola, operates public schools serving the city. Residents are zoned to Lockard Elementary School (K-2), Carver Elementary School (3-6), Robert L. Merritt Junior High School (7-9), and Gentry High School (10-12). The district operates two other 10-12 schools in the city, Indianola Career and Technical Center and Indianola Academic Achievement Academy.

Indianola Academy, a private school and former segregation academy, is in Indianola. As of 2012 most white teenagers in Indianola attend Indianola Academy instead of the public high schools. Sarah Carr of The Atlantic explained that there are two explanations of why the private academies in Indianola and other towns still exist. One says that the public schools suffered from poor leadership and wrongdoing and that the private academies thrive because of the failings of the public schools, and the other says that the white leadership starved the public schools of resources after the academies were enacted, leading to the failings of the public schools.

The Sunflower County Library operates the Henry M. Seymour Library in Indianola, which houses its administrative headquarters.

History of education
Prior to the school district merger, the Sunflower County School District had its headquarters in the Sunflower County Courthouse in Indianola. The district's educational services building is along U.S. Route 49 West in Indianola.

As of 1996, 90 per cent of students in the Indianola School District were black. Most of the white students who attend Indianola public schools transfer to private schools by junior high school.

Government and infrastructure

The Mississippi Department of Corrections operates a probation and parole office in the Courthouse Annex in Indianola.

The United States Postal Service operates the Indianola Post Office. A mural, entitled White Gold in the Delta by WPA Section of Painting and Sculpture artist Beulah Bettersworth,  was installed in the post office in 1939. It depicted cotton harvesting scenes. Murals were produced from 1934 to 1943 in the United States through the Section of Painting and Sculpture, later called the Section of Fine Arts, of the U.S. Treasury Department. The original artist Walter Anderson was unable to complete the mural, and Bettersworth was selected. The mural was eventually destroyed. In 2008, the building  was named the Minnie Cox Post Office Building by an act of Congress.

Notable people
 Mr. Bo, an American electric blues guitarist, singer and songwriter.
 Little Arthur Duncan, an American Chicago blues and electric blues harmonica player, singer, and songwriter.
 Vera Chandler Foster, an American social worker.
 Albert King, an American guitarist and singer who is often regarded as one of the greatest and most influential blues guitarists of all time.
 B.B. King, an American blues singer-songwriter, guitarist, and record producer.
 George Jackson, an American blues, rhythm & blues, rock and soul songwriter and singer.

Transportation
Indianola Municipal Airport is located in unincorporated Sunflower County, near Indianola. and operated by the city.

Media
The Enterprise-Tocsin has its offices in Indianola.

In the media
Art students at Gentry High School in Indianola earned a listing in Guinness World Records on June 7, 2003, by creating the world's largest comic strip in their school parking lot.  The giant Lucky Cow comic strip was big enough to cover 35 school buses, measuring 135 ft. wide and 47.8 ft. high.
 The book Two years in the Mississippi Delta  recounts Michael Copperman's stint with the Teach for America program in Indianola, renamed "Promise" in the book.

Climate
The climate in this area is characterized by hot, humid summers and generally mild to cool winters.  According to the Köppen Climate Classification system, Indianola has a humid subtropical climate, abbreviated "Cfa" on climate maps.

References

External links

 City of Indianola
 Robert L. Merritt Junior High School
 Carver Elementary School
 Lockard Elementary School

Cities in Sunflower County, Mississippi
County seats in Mississippi
Micropolitan areas of Mississippi
Cities in Mississippi